Aromobates serranus (common name: Pefaur's rocket frog) is a species of frog in the family Aromobatidae. It is endemic to Venezuela where it is only known from its type locality in the Libertador Municipality, Mérida.
Its natural habitats are mountain streams in cloud forest. The male protects the eggs that are laid on land. After hatching, the male carries the tadpoles on his back to water where they develop further.

Aromobates serranus is threatened by habitat loss and by predation on tadpoles by invasive trout.

References

serranus
Amphibians of Venezuela
Endemic fauna of Venezuela
Taxonomy articles created by Polbot
Amphibians described in 1985